Tomasz Łuba (born 18 November 1986) is a Polish former footballer who played as a defender.

Career

Łuba started his career with Polish third tier side ŁKS Łomża, helping them earn promotion to the Polish second tier. Before the second half of 2007–08, Łuba was sent on loan to Wisła Płock in the Polish second tier, where he made 6 league appearances and scored 0 goals. On 3 May 2008, he debuted for Wisła Płock during a 0–2 loss to Stal Stalowa Wola. Before the 2010 season, Łuba signed for Icelandic third tier club Víkingur Ólafsvík, helping them earn promotion to the Icelandic top flight within 3 seasons and reach the semifinal of the 2010 Icelandic Cup.

References

External links
 

1. deild karla players
1986 births
2. deild karla players
Association football defenders
Expatriate footballers in Iceland
I liga players
II liga players
Living people
ŁKS Łomża players
People from Grajewo
Polish expatriate footballers
Polish expatriate sportspeople in Iceland
Polish footballers
Selfoss men's football players
Ungmennafélagið Víkingur players
Úrvalsdeild karla (football) players
Wisła Płock players